The Marian University College of Osteopathic Medicine is the medical school of Marian University in Indianapolis, Indiana. It was the first osteopathic medical school to open at a Roman Catholic university.

Founded in 2010, the college is accredited by the American Osteopathic Association's Commission on Osteopathic College Accreditation (COCA). Medical graduates of the college receive a Doctor of Osteopathic Medicine (D.O.).

Campus
The college shares a 140,000-square-foot building, called the Michael A. Evans Center for Health Sciences, with the Marian University School of Nursing, which is located on the southeast region of campus.

History
Marian University opened its College of Osteopathic Medicine in 2010, with funding by a $48 million donation from Michael Evans, the CEO of Indianapolis-based AIT Laboratories.  The college opened as the second medical school in the state of Indiana.  The inaugural class of 162 students began courses in August 2013.

See also
 List of medical schools in the United States

References

External links
 Marian University College of Osteopathic Medicine

Osteopathic medical schools in the United States
Medical schools in Indiana
Educational institutions established in 2011
Franciscan universities and colleges
Marian University (Indiana)
Universities and colleges in Indianapolis
Catholic universities and colleges in Indiana
Catholic health care
2011 establishments in Indiana